NGC 6559 is a star-forming region located at a distance of about 5000 light-years from Earth, in the constellation of Sagittarius, showing both emission (red) and reflection (bluish) regions.

References

External links

 - one of the three nebulae shown was NGC 6559

NGC 6559 

Emission nebulae
Reflection nebulae
6559
Star-forming regions
Sagittarius (constellation)